
Lago di Mognola is a lake above Fusio in the canton of Ticino, Switzerland. It is located at an elevation of 2003 m.

External links
Laghetti alpini della Svizzera italiana: Mognola 

Mognola